Clarence Edward Gauss (January 12, 1887 – April 8, 1960) was an American diplomat.

Personal background
Gauss was born in Washington, D.C., as the son of Herman Gauss and Emile J. (Eisenman) Gauss. He married Rebecca Louise Barker in 1917. He was a Republican and a Protestant.

Diplomatic career

Gauss was a career Foreign Service Officer for the United States Foreign Service. He was posted as U.S. Vice Consul in Shanghai, 1912–15; U.S. Consul in Shanghai, 1916; Amoy, 1916–20; Tsinan, 1920–23; U.S. Consul General in Mukden, 1923–24; Tsinan, 1924–26; Shanghai, 1926–27 (acting), 1935–38; Tientsin, 1927–31; Paris, 1935; Shanghai, 1935-1940. From 1940-41 he served as U.S. Minister to Australia, and was the United States ambassador to the Republic of China during the Second World War. He resigned from the post in November 1944, and was replaced by Patrick Hurley.

Chronology
U.S. Vice Consul
 Shanghai, 1912–15
U.S. Consul
 Shanghai, 1916
 Amoy (now Xiamen), 1916–20
 Tsinan (now Jinan), 1920–23
U.S. Consul General
 Mukden (now Shenyang), 1923–24
 Tsinan, 1924–26
 Shanghai, 1926–27 (acting), 1935–38
 Tientsin (now Tianjin), 1927–31
 Paris, 1935
 Shanghai, 1935-1940
U.S. Minister
 Australia, 1940-1941
U.S. Ambassador
 China, 1941-1944

Later life
After leaving diplomatic service, Gauss was director of the Export–Import Bank of the United States. He died at Good Samaritan Hospital in Los Angeles on April 8, 1960.

References

External links

1887 births
1960 deaths
Ambassadors of the United States to Australia
Ambassadors of the United States to China
Washington, D.C., Republicans
Consuls general of the United States in Shanghai
United States Foreign Service personnel